Moskva was one of six  destroyer leaders built for the Soviet Navy during the 1930s, one of the three Project 1 variants. Completed in 1938 and assigned to the Black Sea Fleet, she participated in the Raid on Constanța on 26 June 1941, a few days after the beginning of the German invasion of the Soviet Union. After the ship had finished bombarding targets in the port, she was sunk by a mine.

Design and description
Their crew numbered 250 officers and sailors in peacetime and 311 in wartime.

As built, the Leningrad-class ships mounted five  B-13 guns in two pairs of superfiring single mounts fore and aft of the superstructure and another mount between the bridge and the forward funnel. The guns were protected by gun shields. Anti-aircraft defense was provided by a pair of  34-K AA guns in single mounts on the aft superstructure and a pair of  21-K AA guns mounted on either side of the bridge as well as a dozen  M2 Browning machine guns in six twin mounts. They carried eight  torpedo tubes in two rotating quadruple mounts; each tube was provided with a reload. The ships could also carry a maximum of either 68 or 115 mines and 52 depth charges. They were fitted with a set of Arktur hydrophones for anti-submarine detection.

Construction and career
Moskva, named after the capital of the Russian Soviet Federative Socialist Republic, was laid down on 29 October 1932 at Shipyard No. 198 (Marti South) in Nikolayev as yard number 224, and launched on 30 October 1934. She was towed to Shipyard No. 201 in Sevastopol for completion, and reached  in sea trials during April 1938. Commissioned on 10 August of that year, she was assigned to the 3rd Division of the Light Forces Detachment of the Black Sea Fleet three days earlier. On 16 November she left for Istanbul to participate in the funeral of Turkish President Mustafa Kemal Atatürk, arriving there a day later. While in Turkey, 40 officers and sailors traveled to Ankara to lay a wreath before the destroyer leader departed Istanbul on 25 November, returning to Sevastopol three days later after exercises in the Black Sea. Moskva transported Turkish Minister of Foreign Affairs Şükrü Saracoğlu back to Istanbul between 19 and 20 October 1939, visiting the port with the destroyer  until 23 October.

She was included with the Light Forces Detachment in a squadron of ships intended to participate in engagements with enemy fleets formed by the Black Sea Fleet in May 1940, leading one of the two destroyer divisions of the Light Forces Detachment, which was capable of independent operations. Late that year, she participated in joint maneuvers with the Transcaucasian Military District in the eastern Black Sea. Kapitan-leytenant (Captain lieutenant) Alexander Tukhov took command of the ship in February 1941. In event of a Romanian attack on the Soviet Union, Moskva, as part of the Black Sea Fleet squadron, was to destroy or capture the Romanian fleet and cut communications, blockade the Romanian coast, support a potential amphibious landing and Soviet troops advancing along the Black Sea coast. To practice this plan, she participated in exercises with the Red Army's 9th Special Rifle Corps between 4 and 19 June, supporting a mock amphibious landing on the west coast of Crimea, near Tendra.

Raid on Constanța

Following the beginning of Operation Barbarossa, the German invasion of the Soviet Union, the squadron of the Black Sea Fleet was tasked with disrupting Axis supply lines by bombarding the Romanian port of Constanța and its oil tanks. The time of the bombardment was set for 05:00 on 26 June, to be preceded by a 30-minute airstrike by aircraft of the fleet beginning an hour earlier. To prevent Axis air attack, the ships began to depart Sevastopol at night, at 18:00 on 25 June. However, before exiting the bay, the ships were ordered back to port because the plan was changed by the People's Commissar for the Navy, Vitse-admiral (Vice Admiral) Nikolay Kuznetsov, who ordered that the two destroyer leaders conduct the bombardment, with the other ships in support. Moskva and Kharkov departed Sevastopol Bay at 20:10, initially heading towards Odessa as a deception measure and then turning towards their destination slightly more than an hour later, followed by the support group.

On the morning of 26 June, Moskva and Kharkov bombarded the port as scheduled, although the airstrike was not carried out. Silhouetted against the dawn, the Axis fire soon bracketed Moskva and hit her mainmast. Shortly afterwards, she struck a mine, probably laid by the Romanians on 16–19 June, which broke the ship in half; prior to the raid, the ships conducting it were not given precise charts of minefield locations. Moskva sank quickly, but German Heinkel He 50 floatplanes and Romanian motor torpedo boats were able to rescue 69 survivors, including seven officers. Among those captured was Tukhov, who was reported by Soviet accounts to have later escaped and been killed while fighting as a partisan.

Notes

Citations

Bibliography

Further reading

External links 
 Interview with diver who discovered Moskva shipwreck

Leningrad-class destroyer leaders
Ships built at the Black Sea Shipyard
1934 ships
World War II destroyers of the Soviet Union
Ships sunk by mines
World War II shipwrecks in the Black Sea